Agonopterix pallidior is a moth in the family Depressariidae. It was described by Stringer in 1930. It is found in Japan and the Russian Far East.

References

Moths described in 1930
Agonopterix
Moths of Japan
Moths of Asia